In mathematics, a transcendental function is an analytic function that does not satisfy a polynomial equation, in contrast to an algebraic function. 
In other words, a transcendental function "transcends" algebra in that it cannot be expressed algebraically.

Examples of transcendental functions include the exponential function, the logarithm, and the trigonometric functions.

Definition
Formally, an analytic function f(z) of one real or complex variable z is transcendental if it is algebraically independent of that variable. This can be extended to functions of several variables.

History
The transcendental functions sine and cosine were tabulated from physical measurements in antiquity, as evidenced in Greece (Hipparchus) and India (jya and koti-jya). In describing Ptolemy's table of chords, an equivalent to a table of sines, Olaf Pedersen wrote:

A revolutionary understanding of these circular functions occurred in the 17th century and was explicated by Leonhard Euler in 1748 in his Introduction to the Analysis of the Infinite. These ancient transcendental functions became known as continuous functions through quadrature of the rectangular hyperbola xy = 1 by Grégoire de Saint-Vincent in 1647, two millennia after Archimedes had produced The Quadrature of the Parabola. 

The area under the hyperbola was shown to have the scaling property of constant area for a constant ratio of bounds. The hyperbolic logarithm function so described was of limited service until 1748 when Leonhard Euler related it to functions where a constant is raised to a variable exponent, such as the exponential function where the constant base is e. By introducing these transcendental functions and noting the bijection property that implies an inverse function, some facility was provided for algebraic manipulations of the natural logarithm even if it is not an algebraic function.

The exponential function is written  Euler identified it with the infinite series  where k! denotes the factorial of k.

The even and odd terms of this series provide sums denoting cosh(x) and sinh(x), so that  These transcendental hyperbolic functions can be converted into circular functions sine and cosine by introducing (−1)k into the series, resulting in alternating series. After Euler, mathematicians view the sine and cosine this way to relate the transcendence to logarithm and exponent functions, often through Euler's formula in complex number arithmetic.

Examples
The following functions are transcendental:

Algebraic and transcendental functions

The most familiar transcendental functions are the logarithm, the exponential (with any non-trivial base), the trigonometric, and the hyperbolic functions, and the inverses of all of these. Less familiar are the special functions of analysis, such as the gamma, elliptic, and zeta functions, all of which are transcendental. The generalized hypergeometric and Bessel functions are transcendental in general, but algebraic for some special parameter values.

A function that is not transcendental is algebraic. Simple examples of algebraic functions are the rational functions and the square root function, but in general, algebraic functions cannot be defined as finite formulas of the elementary functions.

The indefinite integral of many algebraic functions is transcendental. For example, the logarithm function arose from the reciprocal function in an effort to find the area of a hyperbolic sector.

Differential algebra examines how integration frequently creates functions that are algebraically independent of some class, such as when one takes polynomials with trigonometric functions as variables.

Transcendentally transcendental functions

Most familiar transcendental functions, including the special functions of mathematical physics, are solutions of algebraic differential equations. Those that are not, such as the gamma and the zeta functions, are called transcendentally transcendental or hypertranscendental functions.

Exceptional set
The converse is not true: there are entire transcendental functions  such that  is an algebraic number for any algebraic  For a given transcendental function the set of algebraic numbers giving algebraic results is called the exceptional set of that function. Formally it is defined by:

In many instances the exceptional set is fairly small. For example,  this was proved by Lindemann in 1882. In particular  is transcendental. Also, since  is algebraic we know that  cannot be algebraic. Since  is algebraic this implies that  is a transcendental number.

In general, finding the exceptional set of a function is a difficult problem, but if it can be calculated then it can often lead to results in transcendental number theory. Here are some other known exceptional sets:

 Klein's j-invariant  where H is the upper half-plane, and [Q(α): Q] is the degree of the number field Q(α). This result is due to Theodor Schneider.
Thus the function 2x could be replaced by cx for any algebraic c not equal to 0 or 1. Indeed, we have: 
 A consequence of Schanuel's conjecture in transcendental number theory would be that 
 A function with empty exceptional set that does not require assuming Schanuel's conjecture is 

While calculating the exceptional set for a given function is not easy, it is known that given any subset of the algebraic numbers, say A, there is a transcendental function whose exceptional set is A. The subset does not need to be proper, meaning that A can be the set of algebraic numbers. This directly implies that there exist transcendental functions that produce transcendental numbers only when given transcendental numbers. Alex Wilkie also proved that there exist transcendental functions for which first-order-logic proofs about their transcendence do not exist by providing an exemplary analytic function.

Dimensional analysis
In dimensional analysis, transcendental functions are notable because they make sense only when their argument is dimensionless (possibly after algebraic reduction). Because of this, transcendental functions can be an easy-to-spot source of dimensional errors. For example, log(5 metres) is a nonsensical expression, unlike  or log(3) metres. One could attempt to apply a logarithmic identity to get log(5) + log(metres), which highlights the problem: applying a non-algebraic operation to a dimension creates meaningless results.

See also
Complex function
Function (mathematics)
Generalized function
List of special functions and eponyms
List of types of functions
Rational function
Special functions

References

External links

Definition of "Transcendental function" in the Encyclopedia of Math

Analytic functions
Functions and mappings
Meromorphic functions
Special functions
Types of functions